was a Japanese TV show hosted by the members of the group Kanjani8 that aired every Sunday on TV Asahi from 09:30 AM to 10:00 AM. The show ran from April 4, 2010 to March 25, 2012 for a total of 96 episodes.

Cast 
Kanjani8 (Hosts)

(You Yokoyama | Subaru Shibutani | Shingo Murakami | Ryuhei Maruyama | Shota Yasuda | Ryo Nishikido | Tadayoshi Okura)

Tamiyoshi Okuda (Narrator)

Broadcasting Details

2010

2011

2012

Music 
The ending theme was Kanjani8's song "Wonderful World!!".

References

External links 
 Bōken JAPAN! Kanjani8 MAP Official website  
 Kanjani8 Official Website 

2010 Japanese television series debuts
2012 Japanese television series endings
Japanese variety television shows
Kanjani Eight
TV Asahi original programming